Marek Mintál (born 2 September 1977) is a Slovak former professional footballer who played as a attacking midfielder or forward. He is the current manager of 1. FC Nürnberg II and assistant coach of the Slovakia national team.

Playing career
Mintál started to play football in Slovak club MŠK Žilina, with whom he won back-to-back Slovak championships in 2001–02 and 2002–03. This was also due to his scoring 20 (2001–02) and 21 (2002–03) goals respectively. With this number of goals he also became the Slovak top scorer in both seasons. Therefore, he was capped for the Slovak national team for the first time on 6 February 2002. He has won 33 caps and scored 11 goals for the Slovak national team.

After the 2002–03 season, he was transferred to 1. FC Nürnberg for an alleged transfer fee of €100,000 and an agreement that should Mintál be transferred again, MŠK Žilina would receive a portion of the transfer fee. His new club was playing in the 2. Bundesliga at this time. He continued his scoring run by scoring 18 goals and becoming the German second division's leading scorer and was a crucial part of Nürnberg's immediate promotion. During that season, Mintál, an offensive midfielder, became widely regarded for his inconspicuous style of play, which has led to him being called "stealth bomber", "Sniper" or "Phantom". In the following year, Mintál led the Bundesliga in scoring with 24 goals, and helped Nürnberg stave off relegation.

His continuous success in scoring goals sparked rumours that he might move to a bigger club during the 2005 summer break. He had been linked in transfer speculation with Liverpool, Beşiktaş, Villarreal and VfB Stuttgart. These rumours did not lead to a transfer and Mintal decided to stay at Nürnberg. However the following season turned out to be disastrous for the Slovak striker who broke his foot twice in the span of five months. Thus, the offensive midfielder only played in four games and scored just a single goal.

He celebrated his competitive comeback against Borussia Mönchengladbach when coming on as a substitute after 60 minutes. Two weeks later, he also played for his country again, scoring two goals against Cyprus. Later the same year, he was troubled again by his broken foot and had to undergo surgery for a second time.

Mintál won the DFB-Pokal with 1. FC Nürnberg in the year 2007. In this game, he also scored a goal, during this match, he was injured by Fernando Meira, a Portuguese defender from VfB Stuttgart. 1. FC Nürnberg won the game 3–2 after extra time. He scored a brace in a UEFA Cup match against AZ to keep their European dreams alive.

His player career ended in 2013.

Coaching career
For the 2013–14 season until October 2014, he assisted his former team 1. FC Nürnberg in coaching before transferring to Slovakia to complete his coaching license. Mintál returned to Nürnberg as assistant coach for the 2015–16 season and is currently also assistant coach of its U19 team. On 12 February 2019 he was named interim assistant coach of the first team. He was promoted as the head coach on 4 November 2019 for one game.

Career statistics

Club

International
Scores and results list Slovakia's goal tally first, score column indicates score after each Mintál goal.

Honours
As of 15 January 2011

MŠK Žilina
 Slovak Superliga: 2001–02, 2002–03
 Slovak Super Cup: 2003

1. FC Nürnberg
 DFB-Pokal: 2006–07
 2. Bundesliga: 2003–04

Individual
 Slovak Superliga top scorer: 2001–02, 2002–03
 2. Bundesliga top scorer: 2003–04, 2008–09
 Slovak Footballer of the Year: 2004, 2005
 Slovak Footballer of the Decade (2000–2009)
 German Bundesliga top scorer: 2005

References

External links

 
 
 
 
 
 

1977 births
Living people
Sportspeople from Žilina
Slovak footballers
Association football midfielders
Association football forwards
Slovakia international footballers
Slovakia under-21 international footballers
Slovak Super Liga players
Bundesliga players
2. Bundesliga players
Regionalliga players
MŠK Žilina players
1. FC Nürnberg players
1. FC Nürnberg II players
FC Hansa Rostock players
Olympic footballers of Slovakia
Footballers at the 2000 Summer Olympics
Kicker-Torjägerkanone Award winners
Slovak football managers
2. Bundesliga managers
1. FC Nürnberg managers
Slovak expatriate footballers
Slovak expatriate sportspeople in Germany
Expatriate footballers in Germany